New Hampshire's 8th State Senate district is one of 24 districts in the New Hampshire Senate. It has  been represented by Republican Ruth Ward since 2016, succeeding fellow Republican Jerry Little.

Geography
District 8 covers parts of Cheshire, Hillsborough, Merrimack, and Sullivan Counties, including the towns of Croydon, Newport, Unity, Acworth, Stoddard, Antrim, Deering, Weare, Bradford, Sutton, Newbury, Springfield, New London, Sunapee, Goshen, Grantham, Lempster, Washington, Marlow, Hillsboro, Langdon, Windsor, Bennington, and Francestown.

The district is located entirely within New Hampshire's 2nd congressional district. Its western end is very close to the state of Vermont, but does not border it.

Recent election results

2020

2018

2016

2014

2012

Federal and statewide results in District 8

References

8
Cheshire County, New Hampshire
Hillsborough County, New Hampshire
Merrimack County, New Hampshire
Sullivan County, New Hampshire